{{Infobox military conflict
| conflict    = Spanish–Portuguese War (1762–1763)
| partof      = the Seven Years' War
| image       = 
| caption     = 
| date        = 1762–1763
| place       = Portugal, Spain, South America
| casus       = 
| territory   = 
| result      = Decisive Anglo-Portuguese victory in Europe.
Stalemate in South America:
Portugal defeats Spain in Mato Grosso, Rio Negro, and Rio Pardo;
Spain defeats Portugal in Uruguay, and most of Rio Grande do Sul (later reconquered by the Portuguese).<ref name="Lesser">Ricardo Lesser-  Las Orígenes de la Argentina, Editorial Biblos, 2003, see chapter [https://books.google.com/books?id=N74Oo3JJhFwC&q=y+de+Cevallos+El+desastre&pg=PA63  El desastre"], see  pp. 63–72.</ref>
Treaty of Paris
| combatant1  = 

| combatant2  =

| commander1  =

| commander2  = 

| strength1   = Iberian Theatre:7–8,000 Portuguese7,104 British"All told the British forces in Portugal numbered roughly 7,000 men." In Speelman, Patrick and Danley, Mark –  The Seven Year’s War: Global Views, 2012,  p. 440.
| strength2   = Iberian Theatre:30,000 Spanish12,000 French
| casualties1 = Iberian Theatre:very low: (14 British soldiers killed in combat and 804 by disease or accidents; Portuguese losses low.)
| casualties2 = Iberian Theatre:25,000 Spaniards dead, missing, or captured5,000 French dead, missing, or capturedEduard Hay, British ambassador in Portugal (letter to the 2nd Earl of Egremont, 8 November 1762) reported a total of 30,000 Franco-Spanish casualties during the first two invasions of Portugal (half of them deserters, many of whom became prisoners), representing almost three-quarters of the initial invading army. See British Scholar C. R. Boxer in  Descriptive List of the State Papers Portugal, 1661–1780, in the Public Record Office, London: 1724–1765, Vol II, Lisbon, Academia das Ciências de Lisboa, with the collaboration of the British Academy and the P.R.O., 1979, p. 415. See also COSTA, Fernando Dores-  Nova História Militar de Portugal , Círculo de Leitores, Vol. II, Coordinator: António Hespanha, 2004, p. 358, footnote 280.
| campaignbox = 

}}

The Spanish–Portuguese War between 1762 and 1763 was fought as part of the Seven Years' War. Because no major battles were fought, even though there were numerous movements of troops and heavy losses among the Spanish invaders—decisively defeated in the end—the war is known in the Portuguese historiography as the Fantastic War (Portuguese and Spanish: Guerra Fantástica).

Background
When the Seven Years' War between France and Great Britain started in 1756, Spain and Portugal remained neutral, their differences in South America having been settled by the Treaty of Madrid of 1750. King Ferdinand VI of Spain's prime minister Ricardo Wall opposed the Spanish "French" party who wanted to enter the war on the side of France. 

All this changed when Ferdinand VI died in 1759 and was succeeded by his younger half-brother Charles III of Spain. The more ambitious Charles was motivated to preserve Spain's prestige as a European and colonial power. By 1761 France looked to be losing the war against Great Britain. Fearing a British victory over France, Charles signed the Family Compact with France (both countries were ruled by branches of the Bourbon family) in August 1761, and claimed compensation for attacks by English privateers in Spanish waters. This brought war with Great Britain in January 1762. Portugal had been weakened by the disastrous 1755 Lisbon earthquake, leading Prime Minister Sebastião José de Carvalho e Melo, Marquis of Pombal to direct all efforts towards the reconstruction of the country and neglected the armed forces, for which he had little interest anyhow. A new treaty between Spain and Portugal, the Treaty of El Pardo of 1761 rendered the Treaty of Madrid null and void.

War

Spain agreed with France to attack Portugal which remained neutral, but which was an important economic ally of Great Britain. France hoped that this new front would draw away British forces, now directed against France.

The third Franco-Spanish invasion of Portugal in Europe (main theatre of the war, which absorbed the lion's share of the Spanish war effort),"This operation was without doubt the greatest mobilisation of troops on mainland Spain throughout the whole eighteenth century, and the figures themselves bear witness to the government's interest in the operation...and meant leaving the rest of mainland Spain largely unguarded...by way of comparison, the battle of Almansa of 1707...involved a Spanish-French army of over 25,000 men...while the famous attack on Algiers in 1775 involved a mobilisation of little more than 19,000 infantry and cavalry men..." in Enciso, Agustín González (Spanish) –  "Mobilising Resources for War: Britain and Spain at Work During the Early Modern Period", Eunsa, Ediciones Universidad de Navarra, S.A., Spain, 2006,  p. 159, . on 5 May 1762, was followed by a Spanish invasion of Portuguese territories in South America (a secondary theatre of the war). While the first ended in humiliating defeat,"After the Seven Years' War, relations between them in 1763 were extremely bitter (...). Portugal could not at once forget the sudden invasion of her territory, as that of an English ally, by an army from Spain, when that Power decided to enter the recent international conflict, while Spain smarted from a sense of humiliation at the remembrance of the failure of that campaign." In Holmes, Vera Brown-  Studies in the History of Spain in the Second Half of the Eighteenth Century, Vol. 15 and 16, The Dept. of history of Smith college, 1929, USA,  p. 65. the second represented a stalemate: Portuguese victory in Northern and Western Brazil; Spanish victory in Southern Brazil and Uruguay.

Peninsular action (main theatre)

During the war, a Franco Spanish army of about 42,000 men, first led by the Marquis of Sarria and then by the Count of Aranda, invaded Portugal in 1762, at three different regions in three different times: provinces of Trás-os-Montes (first invasion of Portugal, May–June 1762), province of Beira (second invasion of Portugal, July–November 1762) and Alentejo (third invasion, November 1762). They were faced by ferocious popular resistance and, from the middle of the second invasion onwards, by a tiny Anglo-Portuguese army of nearly 15,000 men superiorly commanded by the Count La Lippe.

In the first invasion, the Spaniards – whose final goal was Oporto, the second city of the Kingdom – occupied without any opposition several undefended towns and ruined fortresses of the Province of Trás-os-Montes (there were neither regular soldiers nor gunpowder in the entire province, except in the fortress of Miranda do Douro).

The guerrillas exploited the mountainous nature of the province to cut off the Bourbon's supply and communication lines with Spain as well as to inflict heavy losses on the invaders. The populations abandoned their villages inducing famine among the Spaniards, who launched two offensives towards Oporto: the first was defeated by the militia and peasants at the battle of Douro and the second was beaten off at the Mountains of Montalegre.

This failure and the arriving of Portuguese reinforcements (including regular troops) forced the now diminished Spanish army to retreat into Spain, abandoning all their conquests (except Chaves). After this defeat, the Franco-Spanish commander, Sarria, was replaced by the Count of Aranda.

During this first invasion of Portugal, the total Spanish casualties, according to a contemporaneous French source, general Dumouriez, were 10,000 men: prisoners, deserters or deaths by hunger, guerrilla's ambushes and disease (8,000 according to modern Spanish military historian José Luis Terrón Ponce).

At the request of Portugal, one British force of 7,107 soldiers and officers landed in Lisbon, deeply reorganizing the Portuguese army (7 to 8,000 regular soldiers). The supreme command of the allied army (from 14 to 15,000 men) was delivered to one of the best soldiers of his time: the Count of Lippe.

In the beginning of the second invasion (province of Lower Beira, July–November 1762), the Franco-Spaniards were successful and took several poorly equipped Portuguese fortresses and towns, including Almeida. However, the Anglo-Portuguese army defeated a Spanish corps who was preparing another invasion through the province of Alentejo (battle of Valencia de Alcántara) and avoided the Spanish attempt of crossing the river Tagus, defeating them at Vila Velha.

The allied army eventually stopped the Bourbon army's march toward Lisbon in the mountains near Abrantes (which by its position dominated the country) and used a scorched earth strategy – in cooperation with the rural population – to starve the invaders: peasants abandoned their villages, destroying or taking with them all the food, while the guerrillas attacked their logistic lines. The invaders had to choose between stay and starve or withdraw.

The outcome was the destruction of the Franco-Spanish army, whose remnants – leaving their wounded and sick behind – were chased to Spain by the Anglo-Portuguese army and peasants, after two encirclement movements delineated by a Portuguese force under general Townshend toward the enemy's rear: the first move forced the Bourbons to withdraw from the hills east of Abrantes to Castelo Branco, while  the second made them flee to Spain. The Spanish headquarters (Castelo Branco), was captured by the Allied army who thus made thousands of prisoners (2 November 1762).

The total Franco-Spanish losses in this second invasion were evaluated by a contemporaneous Bourbon source as 15,000 men (Dumouriez in 1766), while the total casualties for both the invasions were about 30, 000 men, according to the British ambassador in Portugal, Eduard Hay (8 November 1762).

As explained by Historians Danley Mark and Patrick Speelman:

During the third Spanish offensive (November 1762), the Spaniards attack by surprise two Portuguese towns (Ouguela and Marvão) – but were defeated - and had to retreat again before the reinforced and advancing Anglo-Portuguese army who took some prisoners. Additional Spanish prisoners were taken when a Portuguese force led by British Colonel Wrey entered Spain and attacked the region of Codicera (19 November).

Thus, Aranda, with his forces ruined and demoralized, sent to Lippe an emissary proposing an armistice (24 November), which was accepted and signed on 1 December 1762.

South America (secondary theatre)
River Plate
In South America, the Spanish Cevallos expedition (3,900 men) was more successful. In present-day Uruguay, they captured Colónia do Sacramento (with 767 defenders) and two other fortresses: fort of Santa Teresa (with 400 defenders),"...Osório , arrives at Castilhos on the shores of Merín Lagoon with 400 men of the Dragoon Regiment of rio Pardo, 10 small artillery pieces, plus a work column, to commence construction ... of a border keep to be called Fort Santa Tereza...", In Marley, David-  Wars of the Americas: a chronology of armed conflict in the New World, 1492 to the present, vol. II, ABC-CLIO, USA, 2008,  p. 441. on 19 April 1763; and fort of San Miguel (with 30 defenders), in 23 April.

Rio Grande do Sul (South of Brazil)
Cevallos advanced and won a still greater victory when he conquered most of the vast and rich territory of the so-called "S.Peter´s Continent" – the present day Brazilian state of Rio Grande do Sul where the Portuguese had only up to 1,000 men (soldiers and militia). São José do Norte and the capital – S. Pedro do Sul- were abandoned without a fight. However, the Spaniards were routed by the Portuguese in the Battle of Santa Bárbara (1 January 1763), when an invading army of 500 Spaniards and 2,000 Indians, in cooperation with Cevallos, tried to conquer Rio Pardo, nearly the only remaining Portuguese territory in Rio Grande do Sul: seven cannons, 9,000 heads of cattle and 5,000 horses were captured.
This huge territory would be completely retaken by the Portuguese during the so-called "deaf war" (1763–1777).

Mato Grosso (western Brazil)
A Spanish army of 600 or 1,200 men (according to the sources) tried to retake the territory of Mato Grosso, in the right bank of the Guaporé River, besieging the fortress of Conceição (the "door" for the gold-rich Province of Mato Grosso). The 100 defenders, after receiving reinforcements, not only resisted but conquered and occupied – until the end of the war – the reductions of S. Miguel and S. Martin, which were main sources of Spanish supply and were located on the Spanish side of the river Guaporé (left bank). They also used biological warfare. The Spaniards withdrew – after losing half of their men from hunger, disease and desertion – leaving the Portuguese in the possession of the disputed territory. Rolim Moura was rewarded with the vice-royalty of Brazil for this victory.

Rio Negro (Amazonia, North Brazil)
The Portuguese conquered most of the valley of Rio Negro, expelling the Spaniards from S. Gabriel and S. josé de Maribatanas (1763) and building two fortresses there with the Spanish cannons.

Aftermath
At the Treaty of Paris, the prewar situation between Spain and Portugal was restored:

Europe
Spain was forced to return to Portugal the small cities of Almeida and Chaves on the Hispano-Portuguese frontier. All the other cities and strongholds had been retaken by Anglo-Portuguese forces during the chase of the remnants of the Franco-Spanish troops.

South America
The Spanish-Portuguese colonial conflict during the Seven Years' War ended in a tactical stalemate, but it would represent a Portuguese strategic victory in the short run. Apart for the forts of Santa Teresa and San Miguel, the Spaniards would lose to the Portuguese all the territory conquered during the war. Colonia do Sacramento was given back by the same treaty and Rio Grande do Sul would be retaken from the Spanish Army during the undeclared war of 1763–1777 and Portugal retained all its conquests (Rio Negro Valley and Guaporé River's right bank/Mato Grosso).

Notes

Sources
Arenas, Mar García- Los Proyectos del General Dumouriez Sobre la Invasión de Portugal in  El Equilibrio de los Imperios: de Utrecht a Trafalgar, Actas de la VIII Reunión Científica de la Fundación Española de Historia Moderna (Madrid, 2–4 de Junio de 2004), vol. II, Fundación Española de Historia Moderna, published in 2005, pp. 537–550.
Barrento, António-  Guerra Fantástica, 1762: Portugal, o Conde de Lippe e a Guerra dos Sete Anos. Lisboa, Tribuna, 2006.
Bento, Cláudio Moreira-  Brasil, conflitos externos 1500–1945 (electronic version), Academia de História Militar Terrestre do Brasil, chapter 5: As guerras no Sul 1763–77
Bento, Cláudio Moreira- Rafael Pinto Bandeira in  O Tuiuti, Nº 95, Academia de Historia Militar Terrestre do Brasil, 2013
Black, Jeremy- The Cambridge Illustrated Atlas of Warfare: Renaissance to Revolution, 1492–1792, 1996. 
Dumouriez, Charles-  An Account of Portugal, as it Appeared in 1766 to Dumouriez, Lausanne (1775), and London (1797).
EXPEDICIÓN A LA COLONIA DEL SACRAMENTO (1776–1777)
Francis, Alan David.  The Campaign in Portugal, 1762 in Journal of the Society of Army Historical Research, Vol. 59, nr. 237 (pp. 25–43). Society of Army Historical Research. London, 1981.
Guerras entre España y Portugal en la cuenca del Río de la Plata
Gipson, Lawrence-  The British Empire before the American Revolution: the great war for the Empire: the culmination, 1760–1763, Vol VIII. Knopf, 1954.
Lesser, Ricardo-  Las Orígenes de la Argentina, Editorial Biblos, 2003, chapter  "El desastre" ( pp. 63–72).
Marley, David-  Wars of the Americas: a chronology of armed conflict in the New World, 1492 to the present, vol. II, ABC-CLIO, USA, 2008.
 Ponce, José Tertón –  La Casaca y la Toga: Luces y sombras de la reforma militar en el reinado de Carlos III. Institut Menorquí d'Estudis, Mahón, 2011,  La campaña de Portugal en 1762, pp.11–21.
PRIMERA GUERRA DEL III PACTO DE FAMILIA (1762–1763)
Sandler, Stanley- Ground Warfare: An International Encyclopedia, Volume 1, 2002. 
Simms, Brendan- Three Victories and a Defeat: The Rise and Fall of the First British Empire, 2008. 
Speelman, Patrick and Mark, Danley-  The Seven Year’s War: Global Views. Brill, 2012, chapter 16: Strategic illusions and the Iberian War of 1762  (pp. 429–460). .
Úrdañez, José Luis Gómez-  Víctimas Ilustradas del Despotismo. El Conde de Superunda, Culpable y Reo, ante el Conde de Aranda. , Universidad de la Rioja, 2009, (part of the investigation project El Imperio Español, Desde la Decadencia a la España Discreta...'', HAR 2009-13824)
Schaumburg-Lippe, William-  Mémoire de la Campagne de Portugal de 1762. 1770.

Wars involving Spain
Wars involving Portugal
Seven Years' War
Military history of Spain
Military history of Portugal
Conflicts in 1761
Conflicts in 1762
Conflicts in 1763
Portugal–Spain military relations